Sebastián Bruno Fernández Miglierina (born 23 May 1985) is a Uruguayan professional footballer who plays as a forward for Danubio.

Club career

Born in Montevideo, Fernández started his professional playing career in 2004 with Miramar Misiones. In 2007, he joined Defensor Sporting Club, where he was part of the team that won the Apertura 2007 championship and the Copa Uruguaya 2008.

In 2008, he joined Argentine Club Atlético Banfield, where he was a key member of the squad that won the Apertura 2009 championship, appearing in 16 of their 19 games. On 13 December 2009 he celebrated with his teammates when Banfield won the Argentine championship for the first time in the history of the club.

On 17 February 2010, Fernandez helped his teammates thrash Deportivo Cuenca in Copa Libertadores, scoring two goals either side of half-time to enrich his team's 4–1 victory in Ecuador.

In July 2010 he had a medical with La Liga side Málaga CF. On 5 August 2010 he signed a contract with Málaga for four years and his transfer cost the Spanish side €3.6 million. He already started to pay off some of his fee as he scored a goal on his debut in a home match against Valencia CF on 28 August 2010. He finished the season with 7 league goals, being the club's second highest goalscorer.

In 2011–12, after the summer signing of Ruud van Nistelrooy, Seba was demoted to third choice striker, often coming on as a substitute. On 21 November he started as a right winger against Racing and scored his first goal of the season, in a 3–1 away win. Exactly one year later he scored his first Champions League group stage goal in a 2–2 away draw against FC Zenit Saint Petersburg.

Fernandez signed for Rayo Vallecano in the summer of 2013 but suffered an injury early in the season, ruling him out of the majority of the campaign. His 86th-minute header in Rayo's 3–0 win against Granada on 26 April 2014 was his first goal in more than two years.

On 1 August 2014 Fernández returned to his home country, joining Nacional. Fernández played for Nacional until the end of 2020. In April 2021, he moved to Liverpool Montevideo. On 5 January 2022, Fernández signed a one-year deal with Danubio.

International career
Fernández made his international debut for the Uruguay national team as a late substitute in a friendly game against Romania on 24 May 2006. In May 2010 he has been called up for 2010 World Cup.

On 27 July 2010 he was reserved to play a friendly match against  Angola in Lisboa.

Fernández scored his first goal for Uruguay in a friendly match against China PR.

Career statistics

International

Scores and results list Uruguay's goal tally first, score column indicates score after each Fernández goal.

Honours
Defensor Sporting
Uruguayan Primera División: 2007 Apertura

Banfield
Argentine Primera División: 2009 Apertura

Nacional
Uruguayan Primera División: 2014–15

References

External links
 Málaga official profile
 
 
 Argentine Primera statistics  
 2010 FIFA World Cup profile
 

1985 births
Living people
Footballers from Montevideo
Uruguayan people of Spanish descent
Uruguayan sportspeople of Italian descent
Association football forwards
Uruguayan footballers
Uruguayan expatriate footballers
Uruguay international footballers
2010 FIFA World Cup players
Uruguayan Primera División players
Argentine Primera División players
Miramar Misiones players
Defensor Sporting players
Club Atlético Banfield footballers
La Liga players
Málaga CF players
Rayo Vallecano players
Club Nacional de Football players
Liverpool F.C. (Montevideo) players
Danubio F.C. players
Uruguayan expatriate sportspeople in Argentina
Uruguayan expatriate sportspeople in Spain
Expatriate footballers in Argentina
Expatriate footballers in Spain